"Animal Magic" is a song by English new wave musician Belouis Some, from his 1987 self-titled second album. Released as the second single from the album, the song reached No. 6 on the U.S. Hot Dance Club Play chart. A popular club remix appeared on the U.S. 12" release on Capitol Records, with remix and additional production by Justin Strauss and Murray Elias.

On the CD compilation Retro:Active7 - Rare & Remixed (2010), Strauss and Elias mention in the liner notes how they thought the vocal delivery of "Animal Magic" was kind of New Order-ish and that "Bizarre Love Triangle" was dominating the clubs at the time, so they tried to bring that sound to the remix.

Critical reception
Upon its release, Roger Morton of Record Mirror described "Animal Magic" as a "pert little slice of softly-softly pop, with some winning birdy noises which totally fail to disguise Mr Some's painfully mannered vocal delivery". He added, "Belouis has a formidable talent for making everything he does sound third-hand. Johnny Morris should sue." Norman Corbett of Aberdeen Press and Journal gave the single three out of four stars and commented, "Laid-back cut not sharp enough to pierce big time success. Pleasing enough sound from Some flows along but lacks bite. Profligate use of vocal talent."

In the  US, Billboard considered the song to be a "melodious and lucid pop number" with "nice production". In a review of Belouis Some, Scott Benarde of The Palm Beach Post described the song as "dreamy".

Track listing
UK 12"
A. "Animal Magic" (Extended Version)
B1. "Animal Magic" (Radio Version)
B2. "Aware of You"

U.S. 12"
A1. "Animal Magic" (Dance Vocal) (Remix, additional production: Justin Strauss & Murray Elias) - 6:58
A2. "Animal Magic" (Jungle Mix) (Remix, additional production: Justin Strauss & Murray Elias) - 7:10
B1. "Animal Magic" (Dub) (Remix, additional production: Justin Strauss & Murray Elias) - 6:10
B2. "Aware of You" (Producer: Steve Thompson & Michael Barbiero) - 3:42

Charts

References

1987 songs
1987 singles
Belouis Some songs
Parlophone singles
Capitol Records singles
Song recordings produced by Gary Langan
Songs written by Belouis Some